Rohozná may refer to places in the Czech Republic:

Rohozná (Jihlava District), a municipality and village in the Vysočina Region
Rohozná (Svitavy District), a municipality and village in the Pardubice Region
Rohozná, a village and part of Osek (Strakonice District) in the South Bohemian Region
Rohozná, a village and part of Trhová Kamenice in the Pardubice Region